Syed Ghulam Mustafa Shah (born 27 October 1959) is a Pakistani politician who has been a member of the National Assembly of Pakistan, since August 2018. Previously he was member of the National Assembly from 2002 to May 2018.

Early life
He was born on 27 October 1959 in Khairpur District, Pakistan.

Political career

He was elected to the National Assembly of Pakistan as a candidate of Pakistan Peoples Party (PPP) from Constituency NA-214 (Nawabshah-II) in 2002 Pakistani general election. He received 60,267 votes and defeated Multaz Ahmed Rahu, a candidate of National Alliance.

He was re-elected to the National Assembly as a candidate of PPP from Constituency NA-214 (Nawabshah-II) in 2008 Pakistani general election. He received 81,194 votes and defeated Khan Muhammad Dhari, a candidate of Pakistan Muslim League (Q) (PML-Q).

He was re-elected to the National Assembly as a candidate of PPP from Constituency NA-214 (Nawabshah-II) in 2013 Pakistani general election. He received 135,502 votes and defeated Ali Asghar Rind, a candidate of Pakistan Muslim League (N) (PML-N).

He was re-elected to the National Assembly as a candidate of PPP from Constituency NA-214 (Shaheed Benazirabad-II) in 2018 Pakistani general election.

References

Living people
Pakistan People's Party politicians
Sindhi people
Pakistani MNAs 2013–2018
People from Khairpur District
1959 births
Pakistani MNAs 2008–2013
Pakistani MNAs 2002–2007
Pakistani MNAs 2018–2023